Nanhua County (Chuxiong Yi script: ,) is a county located in Chuxiong Yi Autonomous Prefecture, Yunnan Province, China.

Administrative divisions
Nanhua County has 6 towns, 3 townships and 1 ethnic township. 
6 towns

3 townships
 Yijie
 Luowuzhuang
 Wudingshan
1 ethnic township
 Yulou Bai

Climate

References

External links 
 

County-level divisions of Chuxiong Prefecture